Chromium(II) fluoride is an inorganic compound with the formula CrF2. It exists as a blue-green iridescent solid. Chromium(II) fluoride is sparingly soluble in water, almost insoluble in alcohol, and is soluble in boiling hydrochloric acid, but is not attacked by hot distilled sulfuric acid or nitric acid. Like other chromous compounds, chromium(II) fluoride is oxidized to chromium(III) oxide in air.

Preparation and structure
The compound is prepared by passing anhydrous hydrogen fluoride over anhydrous chromium(II) chloride. The reaction will proceed at room temperature but is typically heated to 100-200 °C to ensure completion:

CrCl2  +  2 HF   →   CrF2  +  2 HCl

Like many difluorides, CrF2 adopts a structure like rutile with octahedral molecular geometry about Cr(II) and trigonal geometry at F−. Two of the six Cr–F bonds are long at 2.43 Å, and four are short near 2.00 Å. This distortion is a consequence of the Jahn–Teller effect that arises from the d4 electron configuration of the chromium(II) ion.

See also
 Chromyl fluoride
 Chromium(II) chloride

External links
 Crystal Structure

References

Chromium(II) compounds
Fluorides
Metal halides
Fluorine compounds